Vango is a Scottish manufacturer of camping equipment. It was founded in 1963 with the acquisition of tent manufacturer James McIlwraith, of Govan, in the West of Scotland, by Alistair Moodie and its name was changed to Vango, an anagram of the placename.

Vango manufactures kit items for The Duke of Edinburgh's Award and the Scout Association and provides tents for international disaster relief charity ShelterBox.

In 2014 there was a management buyout at Vango's owners AMG Group, with the Moodie family giving up majority control.

References

Camping equipment manufacturers
Companies based in Inverclyde
Manufacturing companies of Scotland
Scottish brands